Henry Van Thio (born 9 August 1959) is a Burmese politician who is the Second Vice President of Myanmar since 30 March 2016. He previously served as a member of Amyotha Hluttaw (House of Nationalities). In the 2015 election, he contested and won the Chin State No. 3 constituency for a seat in the country's upper house. He was sworn in as the Second Vice President on 30 March 2016.

Early life and military career
He is an ethnic Chin and graduated with a Bachelor of Arts in Geography from Mandalay Arts and Science University, with a Graduate Diploma in Law from Rangoon Arts and Science University. He previously served as a Major in the Burmese Army.

Vice Presidency
On 10 March 2016, he was nominated as one of the Vice Presidents of Myanmar by National League for Democracy.

On 11 March 2016, 148 MPs nominated him as one of the Vice Presidents of Myanmar from the House of Nationalities and on 15 March 2016, he received 79 votes out of 352 in the Assembly of the Union, becoming the Second Vice President of Myanmar. He was sworn in on 30 March 2016.

Although many state- and union-level politicians, including Aung San Suu Kyi and Win Myint, were placed under house arrest during the 2021 Myanmar coup d'état on 1 February, Henry Van Thio remained in his office under the Constitution of Myanmar. Since the coup, he has missed several meetings of the National Defence and Security Council, during which the council extended the military junta's rule. In January 2023, he was hospitalised after falling at home.

Personal life
He is married to Anna Shwe Lwan (also spelled Anna Sui Hluan) and has three children. When his wife gained a scholarship to study theology at the University of Otago, the family moved to New Zealand to live in the Dunedin suburb of North East Valley in 2011. He supported the family through casual work, like picking fruit in Nelson and shift work at the freezing works at Finegand, near Balclutha. The family returned to Myanmar in early 2015.

He is a devout Christian, making him the first non-Buddhist to hold the office of the Vice President of Myanmar. He is a member of the United Pentecostal Church International.

References
https://www.odt.co.nz/lifestyle/magazine/man-peace

1959 births
Burmese military personnel
Burmese people of Chin descent
Living people
National League for Democracy politicians
People from Chin State
Burmese Pentecostals
Oneness Pentecostals
University of Yangon alumni
Vice-presidents of Myanmar
Mandalay University alumni